Lapinlahti Airfield is an airfield in Lapinlahti, Finland, about  northeast of Lapinlahti municipal centre.

See also
List of airports in Finland

References

External links
 VFR Suomi/Finland – Lapinlahti Airfield
 Lentopaikat.net – Lapinlahti Airfield 

Airports in Finland
Airfield
Buildings and structures in North Savo